The 2013 Calder Cup playoffs of the American Hockey League began on April 26, 2013, with the same playoff format that was introduced in 2012. The sixteen teams that qualified, eight from each conference, played a best-of-five series in the conference quarterfinals, and the playoffs continued with best-of-seven series for the conference semifinals, conference finals and Calder Cup finals. The Grand Rapids Griffins defeated the Syracuse Crunch in six games to win the Calder Cup for the first time in Grand Rapids' franchise history.

Playoff seeds
After the 2012–13 AHL regular season, 16 teams qualified for the playoffs. The top eight teams from each conference qualifies for the playoffs.

Eastern Conference

Atlantic Division
Providence Bruins – 105 points
Portland Pirates – 87 points
Manchester Monarchs – 81 points (35 regulation and overtime wins)

Northeast Division
Springfield Falcons – 99 points

East Division
Syracuse Crunch – 97 points
Binghamton Senators – 96 points
Wilkes-Barre/Scranton Penguins – 88 points
Hershey Bears – 81 points (32 regulation and overtime wins)

Western Conference

North Division
Toronto Marlies – 96 points
Rochester Americans – 90 points (33 regulation and overtime wins)

Midwest Division
Grand Rapids Griffins – 92 points
Milwaukee Admirals – 89 points

South Division
Texas Stars – 97 points
Charlotte Checkers – 92 points
Oklahoma City Barons – 91 points
Houston Aeros – 90 points (35 regulation and overtime wins)

Bracket

Conference quarterfinals 
Note: Home team is listed first.

Eastern Conference

(1) Providence Bruins vs. (8) Hershey Bears

(2) Springfield Falcons vs. (7) Manchester Monarchs

(3) Syracuse Crunch vs. (6) Portland Pirates

(4) Binghamton Senators vs. (5) Wilkes-Barre/Scranton Penguins

Western Conference

(1) Texas Stars vs. (8) Milwaukee Admirals

(2) Toronto Marlies vs. (7) Rochester Americans

(3) Grand Rapids Griffins vs. (6) Houston Aeros

(4) Charlotte Checkers vs. (5) Oklahoma City Barons

Conference semifinals

Eastern Conference

(1) Providence Bruins vs. (5) Wilkes-Barre/Scranton Penguins 
The Penguins became the third team in AHL history, along with the 1960 Rochester Americans and 1989 Adirondack Red Wings to come back from a 0–3 series deficit and win a best of seven playoff series, and the first team to then win Game 7 on the road.

(2) Springfield Falcons vs. (3) Syracuse Crunch

Western Conference

(1) Texas Stars vs. (5) Oklahoma City Barons

(2) Toronto Marlies vs. (3) Grand Rapids Griffins

Conference finals

Eastern Conference

(3) Syracuse Crunch vs. (5) Wilkes-Barre/Scranton Penguins

Western Conference

(3) Grand Rapids Griffins vs. (5) Oklahoma City Barons 

The game scheduled for May 31 was postponed to June 1 because of dangerous weather conditions around the Cox Convention Center.

Calder Cup Finals

Syracuse Crunch vs. Grand Rapids Griffins

Playoff statistical leaders

Leading skaters

These are the top ten skaters based on points. If there is a tie in points, goals take precedence over assists.

GP = Games played; G = Goals; A = Assists; Pts = Points; +/– = Plus-minus; PIM = Penalty minutes

Leading goaltenders 

This is a combined table of the top five goaltenders based on goals against average and the top five goaltenders based on save percentage with at least 360 minutes played. The table is initially sorted by goals against average, with the criterion for inclusion in bold.

GP = Games played; W = Wins; L = Losses; SA = Shots against; GA = Goals against; GAA = Goals against average; SV% = Save percentage; SO = Shutouts; TOI = Time on ice (in minutes)

See also
2012–13 AHL season
List of AHL seasons

References

Calder Cup playoffs
Calder Cup